Cullen Gillaspia (born May 12, 1995) is an American football linebacker for the Seattle Seahawks of the National Football League (NFL). He played college football at Texas A&M.

Early years
Gillaspia attended and played high school football at James E. Taylor High School.

College career
Gillaspia walked on to the Texas A&M team as a linebacker. He tied Texas A&M's record for most games played as the 12th Man. Coming into his senior season, Gillaspia moved from linebacker to fullback as Jimbo Fisher shifted to a pro-style offense. He started at fullback in every game and rushed for 33 yards on five carries and caught five passes for 52 yards. Gillaspia recorded six tackles on special teams in 2018. In his final play, Gillaspia scored a 13-yard rushing touchdown in A&M's 52-13 win over NC State in the Gator Bowl, the first touchdown by a 12th man in program history

Professional career

Houston Texans
Gillaspia was drafted by the Houston Texans in the seventh round, 220th overall, of the 2019 NFL Draft. He played 12 snaps on offense during the regular season. In the AFC wild card game, Gillaspia made a crucial block on two Bills defenders to set up Deshaun Watson for a touchdown run in a 22-19 overtime victory. In Week 3 of the 2020 regular season, Cullen Gillaspia caught his first career reception, against the Pittsburgh Steelers. It went for 6 yards.

On December 5, 2020, Gillaspia was placed on injured reserve. He was waived with a "failed physical" designation on March 9, 2021.

New York Giants
Gillaspia signed with the New York Giants on March 16, 2021. He played in 15 of the 17 games, recording four tackles (two solo).

Seattle Seahawks
On September 28, 2022, Gillaspia was signed to the Seattle Seahawks practice squad. He was promoted to the active roster on October 12. He was placed on injured reserve on November 12.

References

External links
Texas A&M Aggies bio

1995 births
Living people
People from Katy, Texas
Players of American football from Texas
Sportspeople from Harris County, Texas
American football fullbacks
Houston Texans players
Texas A&M Aggies football players
New York Giants players
Seattle Seahawks players